Old Vienna (OV) is a brand of beer. It was first brewed and bottled by The Koch Beverage and Ice Company in the early 20th century in Wapakoneta, Ohio by Henry Koch and his son Karl J. Koch. The Koch brewery went bankrupt, but production was continued in Canada by the Carling O'Keefe brewery. It is currently brewed in Canada by Molson Breweries, which has continued production after Carling O'Keefe was purchased by Molson.

This family enterprise was founded as City Company Brewing Company Company in Wapakoneta, Ohio in 1862 by Karl Kolter and his son Charles Kolter. The beer was initially sold in wooden kegs (barrels) and stoneware bottles. Glass bottles dating from about 1880 are embossed as "City Brewing Co." on the side and the family's "TRADE KK MARK" on the bottle shoulder. The "TRADE KK MARK" is said to have been  modified from a guild mark for the Kolter family's brewery in Germany.

Charles Kolter and his brother immigrated from Wallhalben, Germany, to Wapakoneta, Ohio before the mid-19th century. His father, Karl Kolter, with his third wife and a number of children, followed a few years later. Karl Kolter was a brewer, as was his son, according to the 1880 census.

The business was later handed down to Henry Koch, Charles's son-in-law, when the brewery did business as "Koch and Kolter". Following Charles Kolter's death, the brewery became "The Koch Beverage and Ice Company", under the ownership of Henry and Karl J. Koch. Karl J. Koch died in 1934 and the ownership of what was to become "Koch's Old Vienna Brewery" passed to Karl's widow, May Julia Koch, and his son George A. Koch. The brewery was sold following World War II, but the Koch family retained ownership of the brewery's soft drink business, which became George Koch Bottling Company of Wapakoneta, Ohio. George Koch Bottling was later merged with Consolidated Bottling Company of Lima, Ohio to become "Consolidated Bottling Company of Wapakoneta, Ohio", aka "Pepsi Cola Bottling Company of Wapakoneta". Karl W. Koch became the company's CEO in 1962. The business was moved to a new facility on Interstate 75 and 4th Street in Lima, Ohio in 1966. The Lima Pepsi-Cola business was sold to RKO General in 1976, but Karl W. Koch repurchased the company's other assets, including its Pepsi-Cola business in Corpus Christi, Texas.

Koch's Old Vienna Brewery entered bankruptcy several years after it was sold by the Koch family. Old Vienna is now a Canadian-produced beer. Old Vienna was brewed by Carling O'Keefe, which had acquired the United States' rights to the Old Vienna trademark following the brewery's demise. It is now produced by Molson Breweries, where it is still being sold in Canada and in select markets in border U.S. states.  Old Vienna is currently produced in bottles, cans and on draft with a 5% alc./vol. content. For a time in the 1970s and 1980s, OV was available in 7 oz. bottles called "OV Splits".

References

American beer brands
Canadian beer brands
Molson Coors brands
Auglaize County, Ohio